Renée Colliard (born 24 December 1933 in Geneva – 15 December 2022) was a Swiss alpine skier. At the 1956 Winter Olympics in Cortina d'Ampezzo, she became Olympic champion in Slalom.

References

1933 births
2022 deaths
Swiss female alpine skiers
Sportspeople from Geneva
Alpine skiers at the 1956 Winter Olympics
Olympic alpine skiers of Switzerland
Olympic gold medalists for Switzerland
Olympic medalists in alpine skiing
Medalists at the 1956 Winter Olympics
20th-century Swiss women